Matteo Rubin (born 9 July 1987) is an Italian footballer who plays as a defender for  club Campodarsego.

Club career

Early career & Torino
Matteo Rubin signed his first professional footballing contract for Serie C1 team Cittadella before signing for Torino in Serie A in a co-ownership for €450,000 fee.

When becoming a first team regular Matteo suffered a ligament injury to his left knee which kept him out of the season for 6 months, sustained while playing for Italy U21 team against Greece.

In June 2008, Torino bought the remaining 50% registration rights of Rubin from Cittadella for an additional €550,000 fee.
In August 2010 he was loaned to Bologna, in exchange with Marco Bernacci.

The following August, having returned to Torino, he moved on loan to Parma, who were without a recognised left-back after the departure of Luca Antonelli seven months earlier and Marco Pisano earlier that summer. Midfielders Massimo Gobbi and Francesco Modesto had previous filled in in that position.

On 3 January 2012, Bologna announced that Rubin returned to the club on loan for the remainder of the season. On 11 March, he scored a calamitous own goal against Lazio at the Stadio Olimpico.

Siena
After returning from his loan spell at Bologna, Torino sold 50% registration rights of Rubin to Siena, as part of the deal of Alessandro Gazzi to Torino from Siena. In June 2013, Siena bought the remaining 50% rights of Rubin from Torino, for a fee of €100,000.

On 2 September 2013 Rubin moved to Verona on a temporary deal. He was assigned number 16 shirt.

On 24 January 2014, Rubin moved to Chievo on a temporary deal, with Manuel Pamić moved to Siena.

Modena
Siena went bankrupted in summer 2014; Rubin joined Serie B club Modena as a free agent. On 16 September 2015, Rubin signed a new 3-year contract.

Foggia
On 25 August 2016 Rubin was transferred to Foggia.

Loan to Ascoli
On 31 January 2019, he was loaned to Ascoli with an option to purchase.

Reggina
On 4 August 2019, he signed a 2-year contract with Serie C club Reggina.

Loan to Alessandria
On 3 September 2020, he joined Alessandria on a season-long loan.

Vis Pesaro
On 1 September 2021, he moved to Vis Pesaro.

Serie D
On 14 July 2022, Rubin signed with Campodarsego in Serie D.

Career statistics

Club

Notes

External links
 2007–08 season profile by La Gazzetta dello Sport

1987 births
Living people
People from Bassano del Grappa
Sportspeople from the Province of Vicenza
Footballers from Veneto
Italian footballers
Association football defenders
Serie A players
Serie B players
Serie C players
A.S. Cittadella players
Torino F.C. players
Bologna F.C. 1909 players
Parma Calcio 1913 players
A.C.N. Siena 1904 players
Hellas Verona F.C. players
A.C. ChievoVerona players
Modena F.C. players
Calcio Foggia 1920 players
Ascoli Calcio 1898 F.C. players
Reggina 1914 players
U.S. Alessandria Calcio 1912 players
Vis Pesaro dal 1898 players
A.C.D. Campodarsego players
Italy under-21 international footballers